Mystic Production is one of the largest Polish independent record labels. It was founded by Barbara Mikuła in 1995 in Skała near Cracow.
The company was initially releasing and distributing heavy metal music, including early albums by artists such as Sceptic, Asgaard and Virgin Snatch. It has since expanded and has been releasing rock, punk rock, alternative rock, progressive rock and pop artists, and its roster currently includes names such as Behemoth, Acid Drinkers, Coma, Czesław Śpiewa, Grzegorz Turnau, Gaba Kulka, Happysad and KSU, among others.

Mystic Production operates also in Czech Republic and Slovakia with office in Horní Suchá.

Since 1996 label owns and runs Mystic Art music magazine (ISSN 1427-5538).

Artists

Current

Acid Drinkers
Akurat
Anita Lipnicka
Armagedon
Artrosis
Artur Andrus
Audiofeels
Bartłomiej Świderski
Behemoth 
Bennebox
BiFF
Blindead
Camero Cat
Christ Agony
Chupacabras
Coma
Cuba de Zoo
Czesław Śpiewa
Decapitated 
Dick4Dick/D4D
Dezerter
Digit All Love
Disperse 
Djerv 
Emma Dax
Frontside
Gaba Kulka
Grzegorz Turnau
Habakuk
Happysad
Himills Bach
Indios Bravos
Indukti 
Iluzjon
Julia Marcell 
John Porter
Jelonek
Karolina Skrzyńska
Kat & Roman Kostrzewski
Kombajn do Zbierania Kur po Wioskach
KSU
L.Stadt
Leniwiec
Lunatic Soul 
Mademoiseille Karen
Maria Peszek
Mariusz Lubomski
Mjut
None
Olaf Deriglasoff
Organek
Orkiestra Dni Naszych
Piotr Bukartyk
Piotr Rogucki
Peter Pan  
Pogodno
Proghma-C
Projekt Warszawiak
Riverside 
Roman Kostrzewski
Searching For Calm
Sceptic
Sorry Boys
Stan Miłości i Zaufania
Ścigani
Tides From Nebula 
Titus' Tommy Gunn
The Boogie Town
The Complainers 
Thy Disease
The Saintbox
UnSun 
Virgin Snatch
Votum
Większy Obciach
Wilson Square
Wojtek Mazolewski Quintet

Former

Amorphis
Asgaard
Bajzel
Black River 
Brown
Cemetery of Scream 
Cochise
Cold Passion 
Corruption
Dive3d 
Farben Lehre
Halina Mlynkova
Hefeystos 
Hermh 
Hunter
Jacek Lachowicz
Kat
Lao Che
Michał Jurkiewicz 
Mouga 
Natalia Przybysz
Neolithic 
Pandemonium
Pneuma 
Oberschlesien
Ocean
Rootwater  
Sadness 
Tehace
Totentanz
Vader 
Vesania 
Zacier

References

External links